Acer truncatum, the Shantung maple, Shandong maple, or purpleblow maple, is a maple native to northern China, in the provinces of Gansu, Hebei, Henan, Jiangsu, Jilin, Liaoning, Inner Mongolia, Shaanxi, Shandong, Shanxi, and to Korea.

The bark is smooth on young trees, becoming shallowly ridged with age. The petiole bleeds a milky latex when broken. The bark is greenish-grey, smooth in young trees, becoming shallowly grooved in mature.

It is closely related to, and often difficult to distinguish from, Acer amplum, Acer cappadocicum, and Acer pictum subsp. mono, which replace it further south and west in China, and in Japan. From Acer cappadocicum it is best distinguished by the shoots which turn brown by their first winter, not remaining green for several years. From Acer mono (syn. A. pictum auct. non Thunb.) it is best distinguished by the larger, thicker (less flattened) seeds. Acer truncatum is very unusual among maples in showing hypogeal germination.

Cultivation and uses
Shantung maple is grown as an ornamental plant in Europe and North America.

A number of cultivars have been selected, including 'Akikaze Nishiki' with variegated leaves, 'Fire Dragon' with very bright autumn colour. The cultivar 'Keithsform' (Norwegian Sunset) is a hybrid between Acer truncatum and Acer platanoides (Norway Maple).

References

External links
 
 Acer truncatum Bunge Medicinal Plant Images Database (School of Chinese Medicine, Hong Kong Baptist University)  

truncatum
Trees of China
Trees of Korea
Ornamental trees
Taxa named by Alexander von Bunge